Adérito Jaime Fernandes Kandambo is an Angolan politician for UNITA and a member of the National Assembly of Angola.

References

Living people
Members of the National Assembly (Angola)
UNITA politicians
Year of birth missing (living people)